The following is the qualification system and qualified countries for the Squash at the 2019 Pan American Games competition in Lima, Peru.

Qualification system
A total of 60 squash athletes (36 men and 24 women) qualified to compete. Each nation may enter a maximum of 6 athletes (three per gender). The host nation, Peru automatically qualified the maximum team size. The top eleven men's team (of three athletes) and top seven women's teams (of three athletes), excluding Peru, at the 2018 Pan American Championships also qualified.

Qualification timeline

Qualification summary

Men

Women

References

External links
Qualification tournament results

P
Squash at the 2019 Pan American Games
Qualification for the 2019 Pan American Games